WTGN (for: "The Good News") is a non commercial FM radio station in Lima, Ohio at 97.7 MHz with an effective radiated power of 6,000 Watts. It is owned by Associated Christian Broadcasters Inc. and is Limaland's first and oldest Christian radio station.  The others in the Lima area being several non-affiliated repeater stations WBCJ, WBIE, WHJM and locally originating low-power WCBV.

History
It was founded in 1965 and signed on one year later. At first a modest operation which operated from 8 am–8 pm daily, it slowly developed into a full-time schedule in 1968 becoming Lima's first 24/7 radio station. Its original studios were located just a block east of its transmitter site on Elida Road (State Route 309). The station was later instrumental in developing Christian television station WTLW in 1976 which came on the air in 1982.

WTGN today
In 1984 a new studio and office facility was opened at the Elida Road transmitter site. It became affiliated with the Moody Broadcasting Network in 1986.  A network of low-power translators re-broadcasting WTGN began in 1990.

FM translators
W254CD 98.7 in Findlay
W268AB 105.1 in Kenton

See also
WLMA
List of radio stations in Ohio

External links
Official WTGN site (with streaming audio)
 
 
 

Lima, Ohio
TGN
Moody Radio affiliate stations
Radio stations established in 1965